Daniel Gjorgjeski (Macedonian: Даниел Ѓорѓески) (born 3 December 1993) is a Macedonian handball player who plays for Budakalász FKC.

References
https://web.archive.org/web/20171202170837/http://b2.mk/news/prodolzhuva-egzodusot-od-rabotnichki-daniel-gjorgjeski-potpisha-za-vardar-junior?newsid=ebBe
http://gostivarpress.mk/danielgjorgjeski/

Macedonian male handball players
1993 births
Living people